Gerris incognitus is a species of water strider in the family Gerridae. It is found in North America.

References

Further reading

 
 
 
 
 

Articles created by Qbugbot
Insects described in 1925
Gerrini